Frank Cruise Haymond (April 13, 1887 – June 10, 1972) was a justice of the Supreme Court of Appeals of West Virginia.

Early life, education, and military service
Born in Marion County, West Virginia, Haymond  graduated from Fairmont State Normal School, later known as Fairmont State University, and attended Harvard University in 1906, graduating with honors in 1910. He received his LL.B. degree from Harvard Law School in 1912. He practiced law in Fairmont and served for six years as judge of the Circuit Court of Marion County.

In 1917, Haymond enlisted as a private and went to France with the American Forces in World War I, achieving the rank of captain.

In 1919, he married Susan Arnett and fathered two children, William S. Haymond (1923–1987) and Thomas A. Haymond (1925–2001) Both children attended Phillips Academy Andover and graduated from Harvard University.

Judicial service
In July 1945, Governor Clarence Watson Meadows appointed Haymond to a seat on the Supreme Court of Appeals of West Virginia. Haymond was elected to the court in 1946 and was reelected to two more 12-year terms. At the time of his death, June 10, 1972, Haymond had served longer on the high court than any past judge. Haymond "was no legal innovator, and not one to impose his judgment on the situation", but "believed that the courts should not go beyond what he called the plain meaning of a statute or decided case".

In 1970, Haymond was awarded the American Bar Association Medal for his service to the law.

Death
Haymond lived to be 85, still serving on the Court of Appeals when he died in 1972.

References

1887 births
1972 deaths
Military personnel from West Virginia
American military personnel of World War I
Fairmont State University alumni
Harvard Law School alumni
Lawyers from Fairmont, West Virginia
Justices of the Supreme Court of Appeals of West Virginia
West Virginia circuit court judges
West Virginia lawyers
20th-century American judges
20th-century American lawyers